Gonzalo Alfredo Sepúlveda Domínguez (born 10 November 1988) is a Chilean former footballer who played as a midfielder.

Honours

Club
Universidad Católica
 Primera División de Chile (1): 2010
 Copa Chile (1): 2011

External links

1988 births
Living people
Footballers from Santiago
Chilean footballers
Chilean expatriate footballers
Club Deportivo Universidad Católica footballers
Provincial Osorno footballers
Kitchee SC players
Ñublense footballers
Unión La Calera footballers
San Luis de Quillota footballers
Puerto Montt footballers
Chilean Primera División players
Hong Kong First Division League players
Primera B de Chile players
Chilean expatriate sportspeople in Hong Kong
Expatriate footballers in Hong Kong
Association football midfielders